Marleen Renders (born 24 December 1968, in Diest) is a retired female long-distance runner from Belgium, who represented her native country thrice at the Summer Olympics: in 1988, 1996 and 2000. In 1995 she won the Antwerp Marathon, in 1998 the Berlin Marathon, and she triumphed twice in the Paris Marathon in 2000 and 2002 (with a personal best of 2:23:05).

She was victorious at the Berlin Half Marathon in 1997 and 1998 and was the 2003 winner of the City-Pier-City Loop half marathon in the Hague. She won the 20 km of Brussels nine times consecutively from 1996 to 2004, which included a course record run of 1:07:46 in 2002.

Renders also competed in cross country running and won Belgium's 1996–97 Lotto Cross Cup series.

Achievements

References

External links
  Vlaamse Atletiekliga 
  marathoninfo

1968 births
Living people
People from Diest
Belgian female long-distance runners
Belgian female marathon runners
Olympic athletes of Belgium
Athletes (track and field) at the 1988 Summer Olympics
Athletes (track and field) at the 1996 Summer Olympics
Athletes (track and field) at the 2000 Summer Olympics
World Athletics Championships athletes for Belgium
Paris Marathon female winners
Berlin Marathon female winners
Sportspeople from Flemish Brabant